Biju Patnaik Hockey Stadium is a hockey stadium in Rourkela, Odisha. The stadium was constructed and well maintained by SAIL. It was possible due to initiatives taken by Late Bipin Behari Panda & M. Kindo in early 90s.

The stadium is mainly used for field hockey and has synthetic AstroTurf which has been host to World Hockey Junior World Cup and been a training centre to most of the international Hockey players of India.

Stadium is the Home Ground of Odisha Hockey Team. Situated on the middle of Sector-5 and Sector-6 areas on the side of the main road leading to Sector-6. The said stadium was constructed and maintained by SAIL, Rourkela Steel Plant authority having AstroTurf with nylon grass for national and international level hockey match and practice. Office of the DGM (sports) of Rourkela Steel Plant, the highest body of SAIL, RSP for propagating and nurturing the budding sports talents of the area is located here. 

SAIL Hockey Academy: This academy has been playing a defining role in identifying talents and shaping their skills to make them represent the National Team in International Competitions. The Academy is proud to have groomed many cadets who represented the country.

Hockey Championship Event 

Number of Annual and regular hockey matches took place at this place throughout the year. Campus is a unique of its kind for the nurture to train the budding Hockey talents of Sundergarh District also located here.

Honorable Vice President of India Mohammad Hamid Ansari inaugurated Biju Patnaik Rural Hockey Championship at Biju Patnaik Hockey Stadium in the year of 10th December 2016 . In which over 1500 teams from Odisha, Chhattisgarh, Jharkhand took part in this championship event.

References

Field hockey venues in India
Athletics (track and field) venues in India
Multi-purpose stadiums in India
Sports venues in Odisha
Rourkela
Sports venues completed in 2010
2010 establishments in Orissa
Memorials to Biju Patnaik